Cellvibrio fontiphilus is a Gram-negative, strictly aerobic and motile bacterium from the genus of Cellvibrio which has been isolated from the Maolin Spring in Taiwan.

References

External links
Type strain of Cellvibrio fontiphilus at BacDive -  the Bacterial Diversity Metadatabase

Pseudomonadales
Bacteria described in 2016